"Homer vs. the Eighteenth Amendment" is the eighteenth episode of the eighth season of the American animated television series The Simpsons. It originally aired on the Fox network in the United States on March 16, 1997. In the episode, Springfield enacts prohibition after a raucous Saint Patrick's Day celebration. To supply Moe's speakeasy, Homer becomes a bootlegger. The episode was written by John Swartzwelder and directed by Bob Anderson. Dave Thomas guest stars as Rex Banner and Joe Mantegna returns as Fat Tony.

Plot
During St. Patrick's Day, Springfield gathers downtown for events, activities, and alcohol. When Bart accidentally gets drunk during the celebration, a prohibitionist movement emerges. The municipal government, not wanting to alienate voters during election season, agrees to consider a ban. They discover that alcohol has actually been banned in Springfield for two centuries, and moves to enforce the law, prompting Moe to disguise his bar as a pet shop. However, alcohol still continues to flow into the town, due to the mob and with their bribery of the local law enforcers. After a group of staunch prohibitionists discover an intoxicated Chief Wiggum at Moe's speakeasy, he is replaced by Rex Banner, an officer of the U.S. Treasury Department. Banner blockades the city entrance and buries all of the alcohol in a mass grave at the city dump.
 
In the meantime, Homer figures out a way to keep Moe's bar operating, by becoming a bootlegger. One night, he and Bart sneak out to the city dump to reclaim the beer that was disposed of when the Prohibition law was enacted, escaping Banner in the process. He then sets up shop in his basement pouring the beer into the finger holes of bowling balls. Using an intricate set of pipes under the Bowl-A-Rama, he bowls the balls into Moe's. Upon discovering it, Marge actually believes that it is a very good idea, since Homer is actually using his intellectual faculties and that he is making enough money to support the family, although Lisa questions whether Homer should be breaking the law whether or not it maybe arcane or unpopular. The media realizes someone is allowing Springfield's underground alcohol trade to flourish, and they give the still-unknown Homer the nickname, "Beer Baron". Banner's unsuccessful policing of Springfield's Prohibition law and investigation into the Beer Baron's identity sees him miss or overlook blatant clues that the law is being ignored by the town and that Homer is the Beer Baron (which is effectively an open secret to the rest of the town).

When his supply of beer runs out, Homer begins to distill his own homemade liquor. However, his stills begin to explode, due to Homer not knowing how to properly make his own alcohol, and he agrees with Marge to stop when one of the exploding stills sets him on fire. He is then confronted by a desperate ex-Chief Wiggum, who attempts to mug him with the remains of his gun (rendered non-functional after pawning the chamber and trigger), and both confide their distaste for Banner. In an attempt to rekindle Wiggum's career, Homer allows the former police chief to turn him in, hoping that Wiggum will get his job back by doing what Banner couldn't. After confessing to his crimes in public, Homer, originally believing he would be let off with a light punishment, faces expulsion from the town (and presumably death) by an archaic catapult, showing how anachronistic the law really was. Marge tells everyone that this law and punishment make no sense and it is meaningless to punish Homer, especially for their freedom to drink. When Banner steps up to lecture the town on the reasons why the law must be upheld, he accidentally steps on the catapult; Wiggum then has him catapulted. The town clerk then finds out that the Prohibition law was actually repealed a year after it was enacted, so Homer is released. Mayor Quimby then asks if Homer can become the Beer Baron again and supply the town with alcohol, but Homer tells him that he is retired. Within five minutes, Fat Tony is only too happy to oblige, and Springfield salutes alcohol's qualities as Homer proclaims his undying love of alcohol by saying, "To alcohol! The cause of, and solution to, all of life's problems." The entire town cheers Homer with beers in hands.

Production
The main plot of the episode is based on the Eighteenth Amendment to the United States Constitution, in which alcohol was banned in the United States. As The Simpsons has many episodes that have stories and jokes related to alcohol, the writers thought it was strange that they had never done an episode related to Prohibition, and that the idea seemed "perfect." The episode features a vast amount of Irish stereotyping at the St. Patrick's Day celebration. This was a reference to when Conan O'Brien was a writer for the show and was of Irish descent, and his use of Irish stereotypes. Various writers were very concerned about Bart getting drunk. This was why he drank the beer through a horn, to show that it was only accidental. This was a toned-down version of what was in John Swartzwelder's original script. Originally Chief Wiggum's first line was "They're either drunk or on the cocaine", but it was deemed too old-fashioned. The discovery of "more lines on the parchment" was a simple deus ex machina to get Homer freed and to end the episode.

When Homer first enters Moe's "Pet Shop", the man that tips his hat to him outside was a background character used in the early seasons. The riot at the beginning of the episode was taken from footage from the end of the season 6 episode, "Lisa on Ice", and updated. The line "To alcohol! The cause of, and solution to, all of life's problems," was originally the act break line at the end of act two, but was moved to the very end of the episode.

Cultural references

The episode parodies the series The Untouchables, with the character of Rex Banner based on Robert Stack's portrayal of Eliot Ness, and the voice of the narrator being based on that of Walter Winchell. Barney leaving flowers outside the Duff brewery is, according to show runner Josh Weinstein, a reference to people leaving flowers at the grave sites of various Hollywood figures like Rudolph Valentino and Marilyn Monroe. The shot of the diner references Edward Hopper's Nighthawks painting.

Reception
In its original broadcast, "Homer vs. the Eighteenth Amendment" finished 39th in ratings for the week of March 10–26, 1997, with a Nielsen rating of 8.9, equivalent to approximately 8.6 million viewing households. It was the second-highest-rated show on the Fox network that week, following The X-Files.

The authors of the book, I Can't Believe It's a Bigger and Better Updated Unofficial Simpsons Guide, Warren Martyn and Adrian Wood, called it "A nice episode in which Homer actually devises a clever plan to keep the beer flowing." The Toronto Star described the episode as one of Bob Anderson's "classics." The Daily Telegraph also characterized the episode as one of "The 10 Best Simpsons TV Episodes." Robert Canning gave the episode 9.8/10 calling it his favorite episode of the series.

Homer's line "To alcohol! The cause of, and solution to, all of life's problems," was described by Josh Weinstein as "one of the best, most truthful Simpsons statements ever." In 2008, Entertainment Weekly included it in their list of "24 Endlessly Quotable TV Quips".

A scene in which a British chip shop named "John Bull's Fish & Chips" blows up was censored in Britain and Ireland but it is no longer. This scene is shown uncensored on the Disney+ streaming service.

References

External links

The Simpsons (season 8) episodes
1997 American television episodes
Television shows written by John Swartzwelder
Works about prohibition in the United States
Television episodes about illegal drug trade
Saint Patrick's Day television episodes
Parodies of paintings